This is a list of the halls of residence, described as partner halls by Liverpool John Moores University (LJMU), available to students of LJMU for 2021/22 and 2022/23 academic years.

The halls listed below are accredited with the University and have the support of the LJMU Student Living team.

Other providers or private landlords are also available to LJMU students, however the providers and landlords not listed below do not have any affiliation with LJMU, they do not benefit from the support of the LJMU Student Living team and therefore are not advised or promoted by the University.

Any accommodation can be used for students of any LJMU campus, selection is up to student preference, (i.e. distance to campus).

Students of other universities can still accommodate in these halls as they are privately owned and operated.

Most accommodation available can be walked by students of both City and Mount Pleasant Campuses.

Former landmark

Notes

References